West Virginia University at Parkersburg is a public community college in Parkersburg, West Virginia. Although it was originally part of West Virginia University, it is now an independent public institution with its own board of governors and degree-granting authority. Conceived as a community college to serve seven counties in west central West Virginia, it now offers baccalaureate programs. It is the largest community college in West Virginia and the state's fifth largest public college with over 3,900 students.

WVU Parkersburg is accredited by the Higher Learning Commission.

History

The college was founded in 1961 as the Parkersburg Branch of West Virginia University. The school's name was changed to West Virginia University-Parkersburg Center in 1966. It became Parkersburg Community College (PCC) in 1971 and was originally governed by the West Virginia Board of Regents. In a reorganization of the state's higher education governance structure in 1989, the West Virginia Legislature enacted S.B. 420 which, among other initiatives, renamed PCC as West Virginia University at Parkersburg, designating it a regional campus of WVU, and transferred its governance to the newly formed University System of West Virginia.

In 2008, the governance structure of WVU Parkersburg was changed by the state legislature. WVU Parkersburg is now controlled locally by a board of governors and is part of a statewide network of independently accredited community colleges known as the West Virginia Community and Technical College System (CTCS). The WVU Parkersburg Board of Governors approved a Memorandum of Understanding with WVU on May 18, 2009, which outlined a formal relationship between the two schools and designated WVU Parkersburg as an "affiliated institution” of WVU.

Naming issues

The school was founded as the Parkersburg Branch of West Virginia University in 1961. Its name was changed to West Virginia University-Parkersburg Center in 1966 and then Parkersburg Community College in 1971. Under Governor Gaston Caperton in 1990, a redesign of the state system of higher education was proposed. The state Speaker of the House was from Parkersburg and added the renaming to the bill. In 1995 this system was replaced by yet another system of college organization under Governor Cecil Underwood, however the school retained the name WVU Parkersburg.

In 2008, the state adopted another system of college organization and "divorced" the community colleges from their parent institutions. WVU and WVU Parkersburg developed several agreements and a memorandum of understanding in the spring of 2009 allowing WVU Parkersburg to retain its name in an "evergreen" agreement.

Campus
WVU Parkersburg is located on the outskirts of the city of Parkersburg. The campus is home to, among various buildings, a library, the main administrative building, the College Activities Center, the Workforce and Community Education building, and the Caperton Center for Applied Technology, which opened in 1999. Recently completed facilities include the Applied Technology Lab, the Early Childhood Learning Center, and Eldon Miller Plaza. WVU Parkersburg does not have any student housing on campus; it is a commuter school.

The school originally opened in an abandoned elementary school on Emerson Avenue in Parkersburg in 1961. The bell from the elementary school, which was cast in 1902 by the Meneely Bell Company, is still used in campus ceremonies and is part of the college's official seal. In 1965, Wood County voters approved a bond levy for construction of a new educational complex. The college moved to its current location once construction was completed in 1969.

The Jackson County Center, which opened in 1975, is a smaller campus of WVU Parkersburg and offers a limited number of classes for students living closer to its Ripley, West Virginia location.

WVU Parkersburg's Downtown Center opened on Market Street in Parkersburg in January 2013 to serve the school's new Culinary Academy. The college has a workforce training lab and classroom at the Polymer Alliance Zone's Polymer Technology Park in Davisville, West Virginia. WVU Parkersburg also owns a small farm that is used for the Diversified Agriculture program.

Chris Gilmer, who began his term as campus president July 2018, stepped down to become campus president of WVU Potomac State College effective July 2022.

Academics
WVU Parkersburg is the first and, thus far, only community college in West Virginia to offer any bachelor's degrees after becoming accredited to do so in 1991. Bachelor's degrees that are currently awarded at WVU Parkersburg include: the Bachelor of Applied Technology, Bachelor of Applied Science, Bachelor of Science in Business Administration, Bachelor of Arts, the Regents Bachelor of Arts (RBA) degree which gives adult students college credit for past work and life experience and allows them to gain a general college-level education without selecting a specific major.

WVU Parkersburg also offers associate degree and certificate programs, as community colleges traditionally do, in a wide variety of other academic areas which are not offered as baccalaureate programs. The vast majority of these associate degrees are Associates in Applied Sciences degrees, meaning they are non-transferable into four-year degree programs, and therefore not suitable for a student who seeks to continue their education beyond a two-year degree.

WVU Parkersburg is accredited by the Higher Learning Commission. Specific programs at the institution are also accredited by the Accreditation Commission for Education in Nursing (ACEN) and the National Council for Accreditation of Teacher Education (NCATE).

Athletics

WVU Parkersburg does not currently field any of its own intercollegiate varsity teams. However, it does field several sport club teams that compete with other colleges, including men's basketball, women's basketball, volleyball, men's soccer, golf and table tennis. These teams are known as the Riverhawks, which refers to the Osprey that can be found on Blennerhassett Island near Parkersburg on the Ohio River. The Riverhawks name was voted upon by the student body during the Spring 2009 semester.

Notable alumni
Donna J. Boley, member of the West Virginia Senate
Anna Border, member of the West Virginia House of Delegates
Jessica Lynch, United States Army soldier
David Nohe, member of the West Virginia Senate

References

External links
Official website

 
Educational institutions established in 1961
Public universities and colleges in West Virginia
Buildings and structures in Parkersburg, West Virginia
Schools in Wood County, West Virginia
1961 establishments in West Virginia
West Virginia Community and Technical College System